The Stade Olympique d'Ebimpé (Olympic Stadium of Ebimpé, official name: Stade Olympique Alassane Ouattara), is a multi-purpose stadium, which can host football, rugby and athletics, in Ebimpé and Anyama, in northern Abidjan, Ivory Coast. It's the national stadium of the Ivory Coast national football team. The stadium has a capacity of 60,000 and was built by the Beijing Institute of Architectural Design. While the stadium itself covers 20 hectares, a vast Olympic village is planned around it, spanning across 287 hectares. 

With a capacity of more than 60,000 seats, the stadium is considered one of the biggest and most modern stadiums in Africa. The stadium is expected to host the opening ceremony and final of the 2023 Africa Cup of Nations.

History

Construction
The ground was broken for the stadium on 22 December 2016 by Prime Minister Daniel Kablan Duncan, with the presence of a China Ambassy in Ivory Coast  representative. It's expected to be built within 34 months and opened in 2019.

In November 2019, the stadium was near its completion. It was expected to be delivered to the Government of Ivory Coast in February 2020 at later. However, there was a delay due to the weather and health issues, including the COVID-19 issue.

Inauguration
The stadium was inaugurated on 3 October 2020 and was named after President Alassane Ouattara. Many officials and the Chinese ambassador in Ivory Coast were also present. A friendly match was played between the two most popular clubs in Ivory Coast, ASEC Mimosas and Africa Sports d'Abidjan. ASEC Mimosas won the match 2–0.

References

Athletics (track and field) venues in Ivory Coast
Football venues in Ivory Coast
National stadiums
Sport in Abidjan
Multi-purpose stadiums
Buildings and structures in Abidjan
Sports venues completed in 2020
2023 Africa Cup of Nations stadiums